Ermler is a surname. Notable people with the surname include:

 Fridrikh Ermler (1898–1967), Soviet film director, actor, and screenwriter
 Mark Ermler (1932–2002), Russian conductor

See also
 Erler